Iannelli is an Italian surname. Notable people with the surname include:

Alfonso Iannelli (1888–1965), Italian-American sculptor, artist, and industrial designer
Angelo Iannelli (born 1976), Italian steeplechase runner

Italian-language surnames
Patronymic surnames
Surnames from given names